Oh Woo-jin (오우진; born March 26, 1991) is a South Korean actor and model. He is known for his supporting roles. He has played a supporting role in the school series Who Are You: School 2015 as Woo-jin and also appeared in the movie Your Name is Rose.

Filmography

Films

Television

References

External links 
 
 

1991 births
Living people
21st-century South Korean male actors
South Korean male models
South Korean male television actors
South Korean male film actors